The following is a list of Supreme Court of Canada opinions written by Clément Gascon during his tenure on the Court.

2015 

{| width=100%
|-
|
{| width=100% align=center cellpadding=0 cellspacing=0
|-
! bgcolor=#CCCCCC | Statistics
|-
|

2016 

{| width=100%
|-
|
{| width=100% align=center cellpadding=0 cellspacing=0
|-
! bgcolor=#CCCCCC | 2016 statistics
|-
|

2017
{| width=100%
|-
|
{| width=100% align=center cellpadding=0 cellspacing=0
|-
! bgcolor=#CCCCCC | 2017 statistics
|-
|

* Note: This list is current to November 5, 2016

Gascon